Qarah Chay (also Romanized as Qarah Chāy; also known as Qarah Chāh and Qareh Chāh) is a village in Dughayi Rural District, in the Central District of Quchan County, Razavi Khorasan Province, Iran. At the 2006 census, its population was 155, in 38 families.

References 

Populated places in Quchan County